Edward Hales  may refer to:
Sir Edward Hales, 1st Baronet (1576–1654), English politician, MP for Queenborough and Kent
Sir Edward Hales, 2nd Baronet (1626–1684), Member of Parliament (MP) for Maidstone and Queenborough
Edward Hales (MP for Hythe) (1630–1696), MP for Hythe
 Sir Edward Hales, 3rd Baronet (1645–1695), MP for Canterbury, 1679–1681
 Sir Edward Hales, 5th Baronet, 3rd Jacobite Earl of Tenterden (1730–1802), of the Hales baronets
 Sir Edward Hales, 6th Baronet, 4th Jacobite Earl of Tenterden (1758–1829), of the Hales baronets
 E. E. Y. Hales (Edward Elton Young Hales, 1908–1986), English historian